The Maryville Scots football team represents Maryville College in college football.  The team competes at the NCAA Division III level as an affiliate member of the USA South Athletic Conference.
The first football team was organized by Japanese student Kin Takahashi.

The Scots play at Lloyd L. Thornton Stadium, Honaker Field. Constructed in 1952, close proximity to the action is provided for a capacity crowd of 5,000. Renovations to the home bleachers and press box occurred in 1993. A new concession stand and bathroom were added in 1997. Visitor stands were enhanced in 2001 while the entire field and entrance were updated in 2001.

References

External links
 

 
American football teams established in 1889
1889 establishments in Tennessee